Sacro Culto is the second studio album by Italian symphonic black metal band Opera IX, released in 1998 through Shiver Records. Beginning with this album, Opera IX started to gradually include elements of gothic metal in their sound.

Track listing

Personnel
Opera IX
 Cadaveria (Raffaella Rivarolo) — vocals
 Ossian D'Ambrosio — guitars
 Vlad — bass
 Flegias, a.k.a. Marcelo Santos (Alberto Gaggiotti) — drums
 Lunaris — keyboards

Miscellaneous staff
 Stefano Tappari — sound engineering
 Armin Linke — photography
 Danilo Capua — miniatures and drawings, artwork; cover painting on the Peaceville reissue
 Paola Gaggiotti — graphics

1998 albums
Opera IX albums